Indian Ridge is a mountain in Greene County, New York. It is located in the Catskill Mountains west of Limestreet. Potic Mountain is located east, and King Hill is located northwest of Indian Ridge.

References

Mountains of Greene County, New York
Mountains of New York (state)